Kathryn Hoefer Vratil (born April 21, 1949) is a senior United States district judge of the United States District Court for the District of Kansas.

Education and career

Born in Manhattan, Kansas, Vratil received a Bachelor of Arts degree from the University of Kansas in 1971 and a Juris Doctor from the University of Kansas School of Law in 1975. She was a law clerk for Judge Earl Eugene O'Connor of the  United States District Court for the District of Kansas from 1975 to 1978. She was in private practice in Kansas City, Kansas from 1978 to 1992. She was a judge on the Municipal Court of the City of Prairie Village, Kansas from 1990 to 1992.

Federal judicial service

On July 28, 1992, Vratil was nominated by President George H. W. Bush to a seat on the United States District Court for the District of Kansas vacated by Earl Eugene O'Connor. She was confirmed by the United States Senate on October 8, 1992, and received her commission on October 9, 1992. She became chief judge in 2008 and served in that capacity until she assumed senior status on April 22, 2014.

References

Sources
 

1949 births
Living people
Kansas state court judges
Judges of the United States District Court for the District of Kansas
United States district court judges appointed by George H. W. Bush
20th-century American judges
University of Kansas alumni
People from Manhattan, Kansas
University of Kansas School of Law alumni
21st-century American judges
20th-century American women judges
21st-century American women judges